The Honduras national basketball team is the national basketball team from Honduras. They have yet to appear in the FIBA World Cup or the FIBA AmeriCup.

Current roster

At the 2015 COCABA Championship for Men:

|}

| valign="top" |

Head coach

Assistant coaches

Legend

Club – describes lastclub before the tournament
Age – describes ageon 16 September 2015

|}

References

External links
Latinbasket.com - Honduras Men National Team

Men's national basketball teams
Basketball
Basketball in Honduras